The Golden Apples of the Sun is an anthology of 22 short stories by American writer Ray Bradbury. It was published by Doubleday & Company in 1953.

The book's title is also the title of the final story in the collection. The words "the golden apples of the sun" are from the last line of the final stanza of W. B. Yeats' poem "The Song of Wandering Aengus" (1899):

Bradbury prefaces his book with the last three lines of this poem. When asked what attracted him to the line "the golden apples of the sun", he said, "[My wife] Maggie introduced me to Romantic poetry when we were dating, and I loved it. I love that line in the poem, and it was a metaphor for my story, about taking a cup full of fire from the sun."

The Golden Apples of the Sun was Bradbury's third published collection of short stories. The first, Dark Carnival, was published by Arkham House in 1947; the second, The Illustrated Man, was published by Doubleday & Company in 1951.

Contents

In 1990, Bantam Books collected most of the stories from R Is for Rocket (1962) and The Golden Apples of the Sun into a semi-omnibus edition titled Classic Stories 1. In 1997, Avon Books printed a new edition of the omnibus, titling it The Golden Apples of the Sun and Other Stories. Harper Perennial titled their 2005 edition as A Sound of Thunder and Other Stories.

The semi-omnibus editions omit three of the stories that appear in The Golden Apples of the Sun: "The Pedestrian" (1951), "Invisible Boy" (1945), and "Hail and Farewell" (1953).

Reception
Writing in The New York Times, Charles Poore reported that Bradbury "writes in a style that seems to have been nourished on the poets and fabulists of the Irish Literary Renaissance", and said he was "wonderfully adept at getting to the heart of his story without talking all day long about it and around it."

Anthony Boucher and J. Francis McComas of The Magazine of Fantasy & Science Fiction found Golden Apples to be a "most uncertain reading experience… material of a curiously mixed quality; writing that is often simply and perceptively moving [and] just as often sadly lacking any particular strength or color".

Imagination reviewer Mark Reinsberg called Bradbury "a gifted writer", but complained that he had "a tendency to overestimate the power of style to nourish anemic themes."

Groff Conklin of Galaxy Science Fiction praised the collection, saying it included "some of the best imaginative stories [Bradbury] or anyone else has ever written. One cannot even begin to describe their delights."

See also

References

Sources

External links
 

1953 short story collections
Science fiction short story collections
Fantasy short story collections
Short story collections by Ray Bradbury
Doubleday (publisher) books